Stephanie Okereke  Linus  (born as Stephanie Onyekachi Okereke; 2 October 1982) is a Nigerian actress, film director and model. She has received several awards and nominations for her work as an actress, including the 2003 Reel Award for Best Actress, the 2006 Afro Hollywood Award for Best Actress, and three nominations for Best Actress in a Leading Role at the Africa Movie Academy Awards in 2005, 2009 and 2010. She was also the runner up for the Most Beautiful Girl in Nigeria beauty pageant of 2002. In 2011, she was honoured by the Nigerian government with a national honour of Member of the Order of the Federal Republic, MFR.

Early life
Stephanie Okereke was born in Ngor Okpala, Imo State. She is the sixth child of Mary and Chima Okereke's eight children. She completed her primary & secondary education in Delta State. She studied at the University of Calabar, in Cross River State, where she graduated with a degree in English and Literary Studies.

Career
While she was still a teenager in the year 1997, she starred in two Nollywood movies; Compromise 2 and Waterloo. During the 2002 Most Beautiful Girl in Nigeria beauty pageant, Okereke reached 3rd place. A year later in 2003, Okereke won two awards, out of the eight nominations she received, at the 2003 Reel Awards for 'Best Actress - English' and 'Best Actress of the year 2003'.
After graduating from the New York Film Academy in 2007, Okereke released the movie Through the Glass in which she served as director, scriptwriter, producer and actress. The film received an Africa Movie Academy Award nomination for Best Screenplay in 2009. In 2014, she released another movie, Dry and again served as a director, scriptwriter, producer, and actress which won many awards including 12th Africa Movie Academy Awards and 2016 Africa Magic Viewers Choice Awards best movie overall movie with the prize of a brand new car. Okereke has starred in over 90 movies.

In March 2021, as part of her campaign against gender-based violence on the female folk, the actress released two short movies (which she produced) titled The Student and Bad Police.

Personal life
In April 2005, on her way to the African Movie Academy Awards held in Yenagoa, Bayelsa State, Nigeria. Okereke was involved in a serious car accident that left her with burns all over and a broken leg.

In April 2012 Okereke married Linus Idahosa in Paris, France, at a private wedding ceremony that was attended by members of her family and scores of Nollywood actresses and actors. Their first son Maxwell Enosata Linus was born in October 2015. They welcomed their second son in May, 2022, seven years after their first son.

Awards and nominations

Filmography

References

External links
 
 Official Website

1982 births
Living people
Igbo actresses
Igbo beauty pageant contestants
Nigerian female models
Nigerian film directors
Nigerian women film directors
Nigerian screenwriters
New York Film Academy alumni
Actresses from Imo State
20th-century Nigerian actresses
21st-century Nigerian actresses
University of Calabar alumni
Members of the Order of the Federal Republic
Nigerian film actresses
Nigerian film producers
Most Beautiful Girl in Nigeria contestants
Nigerian beauty pageant contestants
Nigerian film award winners
Africa Magic Viewers' Choice Awards winners